Allocasuarina decaisneana or desert oak is a medium-sized, slow-growing tree found in the dry desert regions of the Northern Territory, South Australia and Western Australia.  
The Anangu peoples know the tree as kurkara.

Description
Young trees have a narrow trunk and form< and grey/green feathery foliage. They mature to an adult form with spreading limbs and bushy foliage. It is the only member of its family in Central Australia and its large cylindrical cones are the biggest in its family.

The trees have a cork-like bark that is deeply furrowed and is known to protect the trees from fire.

Instead of leaves the tree has long segmented branchlets, known as cladodes, that resemble olive green pine needles. Each of the needles is composed of thin striped segments, which are leaf stalks, linked by a ring of projections, each of which is a tiny leaf. These perform the same function as leaves but conserve moisture. As the cladodes are shed from the tree they form a dense mat around the base preventing other plants from becoming established and competing for moisture and nutrients. The roots have nodules that contain nitrogen fixing bacteria, which allows them to survive in sandy soils with low nutrient levels.

Trees will bloom between March and June forming fluffy red or brown flowers that are small in size.

Desert oaks can be propagated by seed, but they are not easy to grow outside of their natural environment.

Fire will burn the foliage but does not usually kill the tree. They are frost tolerant and drought tolerant.

Distribution
Often found in swales between sand dunes they grow well in deep red sand. The species is distributed through the deserts of the eastern part of central Western Australia, in the southern portion of the Northern Territory, and in northern South Australia. It is often the only tree species to be found in these area where the dominant form of vegetation is spinifex.

A large specimen may be seen in the grounds of the Erldunda roadhouse.

Classification
The species was first formally described as Casuarina decaisneana by the botanist Ferdinand von Mueller in 1858 in the work Fragmenta Phytographiae Australiae. It was reclassified in 1982 into the genus Allocasuarina by Lawrence Alexander Sidney Johnson in the Journal of the Adelaide Botanic Gardens.

The name of the species honours the Belgian botanist Joseph Decaisne, who had never visited Australia or ever seen the tree.

Uses
The tree was particularly useful to Indigenous Australian peoples who used the trees as a source of water. Water can be collected from tree hollows but surface roots could also be broken off in sections to provide potable water by draining the root when held vertically or by directly sucking the water out. The Aborigines also used the hard wood of the trees for making boomerangs, shields and clubs. A boomerang that is 10,000 years old made from Allocasuarina wood was found in Wylie Swamp in South Australia.

In popular culture

The Aboriginal Community in South Australia, Oak Valley, on the southern edge of the Great Victoria Desert was established in 1985 for Anangu people displaced from Maralinga Lands following nuclear weapons testing takes its name from the tree.

References

Further reading
 John W. Wrigley and Murray Fagg (1997). Australian Native Plants. 4th edition, Reed.

decaisneana
Fagales of Australia
Flora of the Northern Territory
Flora of South Australia
Rosids of Western Australia
Trees of Australia
Drought-tolerant trees
Plants described in 1982
Taxa named by Lawrence Alexander Sidney Johnson
Dioecious plants